Heliimonas is a pleomorphic, aerobic and non-motile  genus of bacteria from the family of Chitinophagaceae with one known species (Heliimonas saccharivorans).

References

Chitinophagia
Bacteria genera
Monotypic bacteria genera
Taxa described in 2013